Season thirty-five of the television program American Experience aired on the PBS network in the United States on January 3, 2023. The season began with the film The Lie Detector.

Episodes

References

2023 American television seasons
American Experience